This is a list of musical compositions for keyboard instruments such as the piano, organ or harpsichord and orchestra. See entries for concerto, piano concerto, organ concerto and harpsichord concerto for a description of related musical forms.

Compositions for keyboard and orchestra

A 
Luigi Abbiate
Piano concerto
Johann Christian Ludwig Abeille
Grand Concerto in D major, op.6 (1763), for one piano four-hands and orchestra
Carl Friedrich Abel
Concerto for harpsichord (or pianoforte), two violins and a cello in F major, op.11 No.1 (first printed in 1771)
Concerto for harpsichord (or pianoforte), two violins and a cello in B flat major, op.11 No.2 (first printed in 1771)
Concerto for harpsichord (or pianoforte), two violins and a cello in E flat major, op.11 No.3 (first printed in 1771)
Concerto for harpsichord (or pianoforte), two violins and a cello in D major, op.11 No.4 (first printed in 1771)
Concerto for harpsichord (or pianoforte), two violins and a cello in G major, op.11 No.5 (first printed in 1771)
Concerto for harpsichord (or pianoforte), two violins and a cello in C major, op.11 No.6 (first printed in 1771)
Lev Abeliovich
Piano Concerto (1978–1980)
Anton García Abril
Piano concerto
Jean Absil
Concerto for Piano and Orchestra No. 1, Op. 30 (1938)
Concerto for Piano and Orchestra No. 2, Op. 131 (1967)
Concerto for Piano and Orchestra No. 3, Op. 162 (1973)
John Adams
Century Rolls for piano and orchestra
Richard Addinsell
Warsaw Concerto, for piano and orchestra
Thomas Adès
Concerto conciso, op.18, for piano and orchestra
Isaac Albéniz
Concierto fantástico in A minor, op. 78 (1887)
Eugen d'Albert
Piano Concerto No. 1 in B minor, op. 2 (1883-4)
Piano Concerto No. 2 in E, op. 12 (1892)
Frangis Ali-Sade
Piano concerto (1972)
Charles-Valentin Alkan
Concerto da Camera No. 1 in A minor, op. 10 no. 1 (1828)
Concerto da Camera No. 2 in C-sharp minor, op. 10 no. 2 (1828)
Concerto da Camera No. 3 in C sharp minor (reconstructed H. Macdonald)
Piano Concerto Op. 39 (orch Klindworth)
Eyvind Alnæs
Piano concerto in D major, op. 27
Anton Arensky
Piano Concerto in F minor, op. 2 (1883)
 Thomas Arne - 6 Favourite Concertos for harpsichord, piano, or organ (late 18th century)
Malcolm Arnold
Concerto for Phyllis and Cyril, op. 104, for two pianos (3 hands; one pianist plays with both hands, the other with only one hand)
Alexander Arutiunian
Piano Concertino (1951)
Daniel Asia
Concerto for Piano and Orchestra (1994)
Kurt Atterberg
Piano Concerto in B Flat Minor, Op. 37 (1927–35)
Lera Auerbach
Piano Concerto No. 1 - River of Loss, Dialogue with Time, Wind of Oblivion (Sikorski)

B 
Milton Babbitt
Piano Concerto No. 1 (1985)
Piano Concerto No. 2 (1998)
 CPE Bach - about 50 keyboard concertos, including one for harpsichord and fortepiano.
 JC Bach -  6 Concertos for Harpsichord, Op. 1; 5 Concertos for Harpsichord; Concerto for Harpsichord in F minor; 6 Concertos for Keyboard, Op. 7; 6 Concertos for Keyboard, Op. 13
 Johann Sebastian Bach (all 1720s-1740s)
 Harpsichord concertos:
 BWV 1050 for harpsichord, flute, violin, strings and basso continuo in D major (Brandenburg Concerto No. 5)
 BWV 1052 for harpsichord, strings and basso continuo in D minor, presumed to have been transcribed from a lost violin concerto previously written by the composer himself, used again in the Sinfonia and opening chorus of cantata Wir müssen durch viel Trübsal, BWV 146 and the Sinfonia of cantata BWV 188
 BWV 1053 for harpsichord, strings and basso continuo in E major, probably after a lost oboe concerto
 BWV 1054 for harpsichord, strings and basso continuo in D major, after his violin concerto in E major, BWV 1042
 BWV 1055 for harpsichord, strings and basso continuo in A major, after a lost oboe d'amore concerto
 BWV 1056 for harpsichord, strings and basso continuo in F minor, probably after a lost violin concerto
 BWV 1057 for harpsichord, 2 recorders, strings and basso continuo in F major, after Brandenburg concerto no.4 in G major, BWV 1049
 BWV 1058 for harpsichord, strings and basso continuo in G minor, after his violin concerto in A minor, BWV 1041
 BWV 1044 for harpsichord, flute, violin, strings and basso continuo in a minor, after his harpsichord Prelude and Fugue in a minor BWV 894 and his organ Sonata in d minor BWV 527
 BWV 1060 for 2 harpsichords, strings and basso continuo in C minor, after a lost violin and oboe concerto
 BWV 1061 for 2 harpsichords, strings and basso continuo in C major; the harpsichord parts alone are considered the original concerto 'BWV 1061a' with the parts for strings and continuo added later
 BWV 1062 for 2 harpsichords, strings and basso continuo in C minor, after his double violin concerto in D minor, BWV 1043
 BWV 1063 for 3 harpsichords, strings and basso continuo in D minor
 BWV 1064 for 3 harpsichords, strings and basso continuo in C major, after a lost triple violin concerto
 BWV 1065 for 4 harpsichords, strings and basso continuo in A minor, after Vivaldi's concerto for 4 violins in B minor, RV 580 (l'estro armonico op.3 no.10, RV580)
Leonardo Balada
Piano Concerto No. 3
Mily Balakirev
Piano Concerto No. 1 in F sharp minor, Op. 1 (1855)
Piano Concerto No. 2 in E flat, Op. posth. (completed by Sergei Lyapunov, 1911)
Samuel Barber
Piano Concerto, op. 38 (1962)
Béla Bartók
Piano Concerto No. 1 in A, Sz. 83 (1929)
Piano Concerto No. 2 in G, Sz. 95 (1931)
Piano Concerto No. 3 in E, Sz. 119 (1945)
Amy Beach
Piano Concerto in C-sharp minor, op. 45 (1899)
Ludwig van Beethoven
Piano Concerto No. 1 in C, op. 15 (1798)
Piano Concerto No. 2 in B-flat, op. 19 (1795)
Piano Concerto No. 3 in C minor, op. 37 (1800)
Piano Concerto No. 4 in G, op. 58 (1805-6)
Piano Concerto No. 5 in E-flat, op. 73 (1809), the Emperor
Piano Concerto in D, op. 61a (1806), Beethoven's own arrangement of the Violin Concerto
Piano Concerto in E-flat, WoO 4 (1784), written in adolescence
Victor Bendix
Piano Concerto in G minor, Op. 17 (1884)
Arthur Benjamin
Piano Concertino (1928)
Concerto Quasi una Fantasia (1949)
Richard Rodney Bennett
Piano Concerto (1968)
William Sterndale Bennett
Piano Concerto No. 1 in D minor, Op 1
Piano Concerto No. 2 in E flat, Op. 4
Piano Concerto No. 3 in C minor, Op. 9 (1833)
Piano Concerto No. 4 in F minor, op. 19
Piano Concerto No. 5 in F minor
Caprice in E, Op 22
Adagio for piano and orchestra
Peter Benoit
Piano Concerto, Op. 43b
 Luciano Berio
 Concerto for Two Pianos and Orchestra (1973)
 Points on a Curve to Find - Piano Concerto (1973-4)
 Lennox Berkeley
 Piano Concerto in B-flat, op. 29 (1947)
 Concerto for Two Pianos and Orchestra, op. 30 (1948)
 Franz Berwald
 Piano Concerto in D (1855)
Howard Blake
Piano Concerto
 Arthur Bliss
 Piano Concerto in B-flat (1939)
 Ernest Bloch
Concerto symphonique in B minor (1947-8)
François-Adrien Boieldieu
Piano Concerto in F major
Sergei Bortkiewicz
Piano concerto, op.1 (destroyed, material partly used in the Piano Concerto No.2)
Piano Concerto No. 1 in B-flat, op. 16 (1913?)
Piano Concerto No. 2 in E-flat, Op. 28, for left hand alone, written for Paul Wittgenstein
Piano Concerto No. 3 in C minor, Per Aspera ad Astra, op. 32 (1927?)
Dmitry Bortniansky
Piano concerto in C major
Johannes Brahms
Piano Concerto No. 1 in D minor, op. 15 (1859)
Piano Concerto No. 2 in B-flat, op. 83 (1881)
Frank Bridge
Fantasm for Piano and Orchestra (1931)
Benjamin Britten
Piano Concerto in D, op. 13 (1938, revised 1945)
Max Bruch
Concerto in A-flat minor for two pianos, Op. 88a (arranged from the Symphonic Suite No. 3 (Festive (Feierliche) Suite) for Organ and Orchestra Op. posth)
Ignaz Brüll
Piano Concerto No. 1 in F, op. 10 (1860-1)
Piano Concerto No. 2 in C, op. 24 (1868)
Alan Bush
Piano Concerto, op. 18, with baritone and male choir in last movement (1938)
Ferruccio Busoni
Piano Concerto in D, op. 17, for piano and string orchestra (1878)
Piano Concerto in C, op. 39 (1902-4), with male chorus
Indian Fantasy, op.44, for piano and orchestra
Konzert-Fantasie, op.32 (1888–89), for piano and orchestra
Introduction and Allegro, op.31a (1890), for piano and orchestra
Garrett Byrnes
Concerto for Piano & Chamber Orchestra (2003)

C 
John Cage
Concerto for Prepared Piano and Orchestra (1950–51)
Concert for Piano and Orchestra (1957-1958)
Robert Casadesus
Piano Concerto for two pianos
Elliott Carter
Piano Concerto (1965)
Alexis de Castillon
Piano Concerto in D major, op. 12
Carlos Chávez
Piano Concerto (1938–40, revised 1969)
Frédéric Chopin
Piano Concerto No. 1 in E minor, op. 11 (1830)
Piano Concerto No. 2 in F minor, op. 21 (1829–1830)
Muzio Clementi
Piano Concerto in C major (ca. 1790)
Aaron Copland
Piano Concerto (1926)
John Corigliano
Piano Concerto (1968)
Henry Cowell
Piano Concerto (1929)
Carl Czerny
Piano Concerto in F, op. 28
Piano Concerto in C for four hands, op. 153
Piano Concerto in A minor, op. 214
3 unpublished concertos, mentioned in Mandyczewski
Piano Concertino in C, op. 78
Piano Concertino in C, op. 210

D 
Luigi Dallapiccola
Piano Concerto
Peter Maxwell Davies
Concerto for Piano and Orchestra (1997)
Frederick Delius
Piano Concerto in C minor (1897–1906)
Peter Dickinson (musician)
Piano Concerto (1984)
Ernő Dohnányi
Piano Concerto No. 1 in E minor, op. 5 (1897-8)
Piano Concerto No. 2 in B minor, op. 42 (1946-7)
Felix Draeseke
Piano Concerto in E-flat, op. 36 (1885-6)
Alexander Dreyschock
Piano Concerto in D minor, op. 137
Frantisek Xaver Dusek
Piano concerto in D major
Piano Concerto in E flat major
Jan Ladislav Dussek
Thirteen solo piano concertos including
Piano Concerto in B flat major, Op. 22, Craw 97
Concerto for Two Pianos in B flat major, Op. 63 No. 10
Antonín Dvořák
Piano Concerto in G minor, op. 33 (1876)
George Dyson
Concerto Leggiero for Piano and String Orchestra

E 
Petr Eben
Piano Concerto (1960-1)
Dennis Eberhard
Piano Concerto 'Shadow of the Swan'
Sophie Carmen Eckhardt-Gramatté
Three piano concertos
Ross Edwards
Piano Concerto in A (1982)
Edward Elgar
Piano Concerto (incomplete, completed by Robert Walker) (begun 1913, sketches continue until 1934)
Sven Einar Englund
Piano Concerto No. 1 (1955)
Piano Concerto No. 2 (1974)
()
Gottfreid von Einem
Piano Concerto No. 1
Keith Emerson
Piano Concerto No.1
Eduard Erdmann
Piano Concerto (1928)
A Eshpai
Piano Concerto No. 2

F 
 Manuel de Falla - Concerto for harpsichord (1926)
Ernest Farrar
Variations for Piano and Orchestra Op. 25
Gabriel Fauré
Ballade for Piano and Orchestra
Samuil Feinberg
Piano Concerto No. 1,op. 20 (1931)
Piano Concerto No. 2 (1945)
Howard Ferguson
Piano Concerto in D (1951)
John Field
Piano Concerto No. 1 in E-flat, H. 27 (1799)
Piano Concerto No. 2 in A-flat, H. 31 (1811)
Piano Concerto No. 3 in E-flat, H. 32 (1811)
Piano Concerto No. 4 in E-flat, H. 28 (1814, revised 1819)
Piano Concerto No. 5 in C, H. 39 (1817), l'Incedie par l'Orage
Piano Concerto No. 6 in C, H. 49 (1819, revised 1820)
Piano Concerto No. 7 in C minor, H. 58 (1822, revised 1822-32)
Gerald Finzi
Grand Fantasia and Toccata for Piano and Orchestra Op. 38
Eclogue for Piano and Strings Op. 10
Nicholas Flagello
Piano Concerto No. 1 (1950)
 Joseph Dillon Ford Concerto for Harpsichord (2006)
Wilhelm Fortner
Mouvements for Piano and Orchestra (1954)
Lukas Foss
Piano Concerto No. 1 (1939–43)
Piano Concerto No. 2 (1951)
Jean Françaix
Concertino in G major (1932)
Concerto pour piano et orchestre (1936)
César Franck
Piano Concerto No. 2 in B minor, Op. 11 (juvenilia, 1835)
Symphonic Variations (1885)
Gunnar de Frumerie
Variations and Fugue for Piano and Orchestra (1932)
Robert Fuchs
Piano Concerto in B-flat minor, Op. 27 (1879–80)
Wilhelm Furtwängler
Symphonic Piano Concerto in B minor (1936-7)

G 
Kyle Gann
 Sunken City (Concerto for piano and winds) (2007)
Roberto Gerhard
 Piano Concerto (1951)
Concerto for Piano and Strings (1961)
 Concerto for harpsichord, percussion and strings (mid 20th century)
George Gershwin
Piano Concerto in F (1925)
Alberto Ginastera
Piano Concerto No. 1, op. 28 (1961)
Piano Concerto No. 2 (1972)
Peggy Glanville-Hicks
Etruscan Concerto
Philip Glass
Piano Concerto No. 1 Tirol (2000)
Concerto for Harpsichord and Chamber Orchestra (2002)
Piano Concerto No. 2 After Lewis and Clark (2004)
Alexander Glazunov
Piano Concerto No. 1 in F minor, op. 92 (1911)
Piano Concerto No. 2 in B, op. 100
Benjamin Godard
Piano Concerto No. 1 in A minor, op. 31 (1879)
Piano Concerto No. 2 in G minor, op. 148 (1899)
Alexander Goedicke
Piano Concerto, op. 11 (1900)
Hermann Goetz
Piano Concerto in E-flat (1861)
Piano Concerto in B-flat, op. 18 (1867)
Otar Gordeli
Piano concerto in C minor (1951)
Piano Concerto in C minor, op. 2 (1952)
 Henryk Górecki - Harpsichord Concerto (1980)
Arthur de Greef
Piano Concerto No. 1 in C minor
Piano Concerto No. 2 in B flat minor
Edvard Grieg
Piano Concerto in A minor, op. 16 (1868)
Ferde Grofé
Concerto for Piano and Orchestra in D (1958)
Camargo Guarnieri
Piano Concerto No. 1
Piano Concerto No. 2
Piano Concerto No. 3

H 
Reynaldo Hahn
Piano Concerto in E (1930)
Howard Hanson
Piano Concerto in G, op. 36 (1948)
Hamilton Harty
Piano Concerto in B minor (1922)
Joseph Hallman
Rhapsody Concerto for Violin and Piano with Strings (2015)
Georg Friedrich Händel
Organ concertos:
HWV 289 – Op. 4 No. 1 in G minor
HWV 290 – Op. 4 No. 2 in B-flat major
HWV 291 – Op. 4 No. 3 in G minor
HWV 292 – Op. 4 No. 4 in F major
HWV 293 – Op. 4 No. 5 in F major
HWV 294 – Op. 4 No. 6 in B-flat major
HWV 306 – Op. 7 No. 1 in B-flat major
HWV 307 – Op. 7 No. 2 in A major
HWV 308 – Op. 7 No. 3 in B-flat major
HWV 309 – Op. 7 No. 4 in D minor
HWV 310 – Op. 7 No. 5 in G minor
HWV 311 – Op. 7 No. 6 in B-flat major
Joseph Haydn
Concerto in C, Hob. XVIII/1 (1756)
Concerto in F, Hob. XVIII/3 (c. 1765)
Concerto in G, Hob. XVIII/4 (before 1782)
Concerto in C, Hob. XVIII/5 (before 1763)
Concerto in F, Hob. XVIII/7 (before 1766)
Concerto in G, Hob. XVIII/9 (before 1767)
Concerto in C, Hob. XVIII/10 (c. 1760)
Concerto in D, Hob. XVIII/11 (before 1782) - this is the one usually known as the Haydn concerto
Concerto in C, Hob. XVIII/12
Christopher Headington
Piano Concerto
Adolf von Henselt
Piano Concerto in F minor, Op. 16 (1839–47)
Hans Werner Henze
Piano Concerto No. 1 (1950)
Piano Concerto No. 2 (1967)
Henri Herz
Piano Concerto No. 1 in A, op. 34 (1828)
Piano Concerto No. 2 in C minor, op. 74 (1834)
Piano Concerto No. 3 in D minor, op. 87 (1835)
Piano Concerto No. 4 in E, op. 131 (1843)
Piano Concerto No. 5 in F minor, op. 180 (1854)
Piano Concerto No. 6 in A, op. 192 (1858), with chorus
Piano Concerto No. 7 in B minor, op. 207 (1864)
Piano Concerto No. 8 in A-flat, op. 218 (1873)
Paul Hindemith
Piano Concerto (1945)
Alun Hoddinott
Concerto for Piano, Winds and Percussion, op. 19 (1961)
Concerto No. 2, op. 21 (1960)
Concerto No. 3, op. 44 (1966)
Josef Hofmann
Chromatikon, for piano and orchestra
Joseph Holbrooke
Piano Concerto No. 1, op. 52 The Song of Gwyn ap Nudd (1906-8)
Piano Concerto No. 2, op. 100 L'Orient
Arthur Honegger
Concertino (1924)
Herbert Howells
Piano Concerto No.2 in C minor (1925)
Bertold Hummel
Divertimento capriccioso (after themes from the Opera Il Flaminio by G.B. Pergolesi) for harpsichord or piano and chamber orchestra (1958)
Johann Nepomuk Hummel
Piano Concerto in A, s4 / WoO. 24 (1790s)
Piano Concerto in A, s5 / WoO. 24a (1790s)
Piano Concerto in C, op. 34a (1811)
Concertino in G, Op. 73
Piano Concerto in A minor, op. 85 (1821)
Piano Concerto in B minor, op. 89 (1819)
Piano Concerto in E, op. 110, Les Adieux (1826)
Piano Concerto in A-flat, op. 113 (1830)
Piano Concerto in F, op. posth. 1 (1839)
William Yeates Hurlstone
Piano Concerto in D
Henry Holden Huss
Piano Concerto in B, op. 10

I 
John Ireland
Piano Concerto in E-flat (1930)
Charles Ives
Emerson Concerto, reconstructed by David G. Porter from Ives' drafts of the Emerson Overture for Piano and Orchestra

J 
Gordon Jacob
Concerto for Three Hands
André Jolivet
Piano Concerto (1950)

K 
Dmitry Kabalevsky
Piano Concerto No. 1 in A minor, op. 9 (1928)
Piano Concerto No. 2 in G minor, op. 23 (1935)
Piano Concerto No. 3 in D, op. 50 'Youth Concerto' (1952)
Piano Concerto No. 4 in C, op. 99 'Prague' (1975) 
Friedrich Wilhelm Michael Kalkbrenner
Piano Concerto No.1 in D minor, op. 61 (1823)
Piano Concerto No.2, op.85
Piano Concerto No.3
Piano Concerto No.4 in A-flat major, op. 127 (1835)
Shigeru Kan-no
Piano Concerto No.1 (1997)
Piano Concerto No.2 (1999)
Piano Concerto No.3 (2006)
Nikolai Kapustin
Concertino for piano and orchestra, op. 1 (1957)
Concerto for piano and orchestra No. 1, op. 2 (1961)
Concerto for piano and orchestra No. 2, op. 14 (1974)
Concerto for piano and orchestra No. 3, op. 48 (1985)
Concerto for piano and orchestra No. 4, op. 56 (1989)
Concerto for piano and orchestra No. 5, op. 72 (1993)
Concerto for piano and orchestra No. 6, op. 74 (1993)
Alemdar Karamanov
Piano Concerto No. 3 'Ave Maria'
Hugo Kaun (1863–1932)
Piano Concerto No.1 E flat-minor, op. 50
Piano Concerto No.2 C minor, op. 115 (1925)
Aram Khachaturian
Concert-Rhapsody in D flat (1967)
Piano Concerto in D-flat (1936)
Tikhon Khrennikov
Piano Concerto No.1 in F, op. 1 (1933)
Piano Concerto No.2 in C, op. 21 (1972)
Piano Concerto No.3 in C, op. 28 (1983/84)
Friedrich Kiel
Piano Concerto in B-flat, op. 30 (1864)
Wojciech Kilar
Piano Concerto (1997)
Reginald King
Fantasie for Piano and Orchestra
Charles Koechlin
Ballade for Piano and Orchestra
Seigfreid Kohler
Piano Concerto Op. 46 (1971–72)
Erich Wolfgang Korngold
Piano Concerto in C-sharp for the left hand, Op. 17 (1923, commissioned by Paul Wittgenstein)
Leopold Kozeluch
Concerto for Two Pianos in B flat major
Ernst Krenek
Piano Concerto No. 1 in F-sharp, op. 18 (1923)
Piano Concerto No. 2, op. 81 (1937)
Piano Concerto No. 3, op. 107 (1946)
Piano Concerto No. 4 (1950)
Concerto for Two Pianos (1951)
Friedrich Kuhlau
Piano Concerto in C, op. 7 (1810)
Theodor Kullak
Piano Concerto in C minor, op. 55 (1850)

L 
Helmut Lachenmann
Ausklang: Piano Concerto in F (1985)
Edouard Lalo
Piano Concerto in F (1889)
Constant Lambert
Concerto for piano and nine players (1931)
Marcel Landowski
Piano Concerto No. 2
Shawn Lane
Piano Concertino: Transformation of Themes (1992)
Henri Lazarof
Tableaux (after Kandinsky) for Piano and Orchestra
Dieter Lehnhoff
Piano Concerto No. 1 (2005)
Piano Concerto No. 2 (2007)
 Walter Leigh - Concertino for Harpsichord and String Orchestra (1934)
Kenneth Leighton
Piano Concerto No. 1, op. 11 (1951)
Piano Concerto No. 2, op. 37 (1960)
Piano Concerto No. 3, op. 57 (1969)
Artur Lemba
Piano Concerto No. 1 in G major (1905)
Piano Concerto No. 2 in e minor (1931)
Piano Concerto No. 3 in f minor (1945)
Piano Concerto No. 4 in B major (1955)
Piano Concerto No. 5 (1960)
Theodor Leschtizky
Piano Concerto in C minor, Op. 9
Lowell Liebermann
Piano Concerto No. 1, op. 12 (1983)
Piano Concerto No. 2, op. 36 (1992)
Peter Lieberson
Piano Concerto
György Ligeti
Piano Concerto (1988)
Magnus Lindberg
Piano Concerto (1990–94)
Dinu Lipatti
 Concertino Op. 3
Romanian Dances for Piano and Orchestra
Franz Liszt
Piano Concerto No. 1 in E-flat, S. 124 (1835)
Piano Concerto No. 2 in A, S. 125 (1839)
Piano Concerto in E flat, op. posth., S. 125a
Fantasie über ungarische Volksmelodien, (Hungarian Fantasy) S.123
Totentanz, paraphrase on 'Dies Irae'
Grande symphonic Fantasie  on themes from Berlioz's 'Lelio'
Fantasie on themes from Beethoven's 'Ruins of Athens'
Malediction for piano and string orchestra
Wanderer-Fantasie (from SChubert D970)
Polonaise brilliante in E flat major (from Weber's 'L'Hilarite)
De Profundis
Henry Charles Litolff
Concerto Symphonique No. 1 in D minor, now lost
Concerto Symphonique No. 2 in B minor, op. 22
Concerto Symphonique No. 3 in E-flat, op. 45 (1846)
Concerto Symphonique No. 4 in D minor, op. 102
Concerto Symphonique No. 5 in C minor, op. 123 (1870)
Nikolai Lopatnikoff
Concerto for two Pianos and Orchestra (1949–50)
Bent Lorentzen
Piano Concerto
George Lloyd
Piano Concerto No. 1 ('Scapegoat')
Piano Concerto No. 2
Piano Concerto No. 3
Witold Lutosławski
Piano Concerto (1987)
Sergei Lyapunov
Piano Concerto No. 1 in E-flat minor, op. 4 (1886)
Piano Concerto No. 2 in E, op. 38 (1909)

M 
Frederik Magle
Concerto for organ and orchestra "The Infinite Second" (1994)
John McCabe
Piano Concerto No. 1, op. 43 (1966)
Piano Concerto No. 2
Piano Concetino (1968)
Piano Concerto No. 3, Dialogues (1976)
Edward Alexander MacDowell
Piano Concerto No. 1 in A minor, op. 15 (1882)
Piano Concerto No. 2 in D minor, op. 23 (1885)
Alexander Campbell Mackenzie
Scottish Concerto in G major, op. 55 (1897)
Gian Francesco Malipiero
Six Piano Concertos (1934–1964)
Dialoghi VII (Concerto) for Two Pianos and Orchestra (1956)
Otto Malling
Piano Concerto in C minor Op. 43 (1890)
Frank Martin
Piano Concerto No. 1 in F minor (1934)
Harpsichord Concerto (1951–52)
Piano Concerto No. 2 (1968–69)
Bohuslav Martinů
Piano Concerto No. 1 (1925)
Concertino for piano left hand and chamber orchestra, op. 173 (1926)
Piano Concerto No. 2 (1934)
 Harpsichord Concerto (1935)
Concertino (1938)
Concerto for Two Pianos (1943)
Piano Concerto No. 3 (1948)
Piano Concerto No. 4 (1956, Incantations)
Piano Concerto No. 5 (1957, Fantasia concertante) (see )
Giuseppe Martucci
Piano Concerto in D minor op. 40
Piano Concerto in B-flat minor op. 66 (1884-5)
Joseph Marx
Romantisches Klavierkonzert in E
Jules Massenet
Piano Concerto in E flat
Nikolai Karlovich Medtner
Piano Concerto No. 1 in C minor, op. 33 (1914–18)
Piano Concerto No. 2 in C minor, op. 50 (1920–27)
Piano Concerto No. 3 in E minor, op. 60 (1940–43)
Henryk Melcer
 Concerto for Piano and Orchestra No. 1 in E minor (1895)
 Concerto for Piano and Orchestra No. 2 in C minor (1898)
Felix Mendelssohn
Piano Concerto in A minor (1822)
Concerto in E for two pianos (1823)
Concerto in A flat for two pianos (1824)
Piano Concerto No. 1 in G minor, op. 25 (1831)
Piano Concerto No. 2 in D minor, op. 40 (1837)
Peter Menin
Piano Concerto
Giancarlo Menotti
Piano Concerto in F
Ernest Meyer
Piano Concerto
Darius Milhaud
Piano Concerto No. 1, op. 127 (1933)
Piano Concerto No. 2, op. 225 (1941)
Concerto for 2 (or 3) Pianos, op. 228 (1941)
Piano Concerto No. 3, op. 270 (1946)
Piano Concerto No. 4, op. 295 (1949)
Concertino d'automne, for 2 pianos & 8 instruments, op. 309 (1951)
Piano Concerto No. 5, op. 346 (1955)
E. J. Moeran
Rhapsody in F sharp minor for Piano and Orchestra (1943)
 Georg Matthias Monn - Harpsichord concerto in G minor, Harpsichord concerto in D major (18th Century)
Xavier Montsalvatge
Concerto Breve
Ignaz Moscheles
Piano Concerto No. 1 in F, op. 45 (1818)
Piano Concerto No. 2 in E-flat, op. 56
Piano Concerto No. 3 in G minor, op. 58
Piano Concerto No. 4 in E, op. 64 (1823)
Piano Concerto No. 5 in C, op. 87 (1826–31)
Piano Concerto No. 6 in B-flat, op. 90 Fantastique (1834)
Piano Concerto No. 7 in C minor, op. 93 Pathétique (1835)
Piano Concerto No. 8 in D, Pastorale, op. 96 (1838) - the orchestral parts for this concerto have been lost
Mihaly Mosonyi
Piano Concerto
Moritz Moszkowski
Piano Concerto in E minor, Op. 59
Franz Xaver Mozart
Piano Concerto No. 1 in C major, Op. 14
PIano Concerto No. 2 in E flat major Op. 25
Wolfgang Amadeus Mozart - wrote twenty seven concertos in all, of which Nos. 1-4 are arrangements of sonata movements by other composers.
Piano Concerto No. 1 in F, K. 37 (1767)
Piano Concerto No. 2 in B-flat, K. 39 (1767)
Piano Concerto No. 3 in D, K. 40 (1767)
Piano Concerto No. 4 in G, K. 41 (1767)
Piano Concerto No. 5 in D, K. 175 (1773)
Piano Concerto No. 6 in B-flat, K. 238 (1776)
Concerto for 3 Pianos No. 7 in F major, K.242 (1776), the Lodron
Piano Concerto No. 8 in C, K. 246 (1776), the Lützow
Piano Concerto No. 9 in E-flat, K. 271 (1777), the Jeunehomme
Concerto for Two Pianos in E-flat, K. 365 (1779)
Piano Concerto No. 11 in F, K. 413 (1783)
Piano Concerto No. 12 in A, K. 414 (1782)
Piano Concerto No. 13 in C, K. 415 (1783)
Piano Concerto No. 14 in E-flat, K. 449 (1784)
Piano Concerto No. 15 in B-flat, K. 450 (1784)
Piano Concerto No. 16 in D, K. 451 (1784)
Piano Concerto No. 17 in G, K. 453 (1784)
Piano Concerto No. 18 in B-flat, K. 456 (1784)
Piano Concerto No. 19 in F, K. 459 (1784)
Piano Concerto No. 20 in D minor, K. 466 (1785)
Piano Concerto No. 21 in C, K. 467 (1785)
Piano Concerto No. 22 in E-flat, K. 482 (1785)
Piano Concerto No. 23 in A, K. 488 (1786)
Piano Concerto No. 24 in C minor, K. 491 (1786)
Piano Concerto No. 25 in C, K. 503 (1786)
Piano Concerto No. 26 in D, K. 537 (1788), the Coronation
Piano Concerto No. 27 in B-flat, K. 595 (1791)
Concert Rondo No. 1 in D, K. 382 (1782)
Concert Rondo No. 2 in A, K. 386 (1782)
Dominic Muldowney
Piano Concerto (1982)

N 
Eduard Nápravník
Concerto symphonique in A minor Op 27 (1877)
Dieter Nowka
Piano Concerto No. 1 for the left hand op. 71 (1963)
Piano Concerto No.2 (1972)
Michael Nyman
The Piano Concerto

O 
Hisato Ohzawa
Piano Concerto No. 3 'Kamikaze' (1938)
Leo Ornstein
Piano Concerto (1925)

P 
Ignacy Paderewski
Piano Concerto in A minor, op. 17 (1888)
Giovanni Paisiello
Concerto for Piano and Orchestra, No 1 in C major
Concerto for Piano and Orchestra, No 2 in F major
Concerto for Piano and Orchestra, No 3 in A major
Concerto for Piano and Orchestra, No 4 in G minor
Concerto for Piano and Orchestra, No 5 in D major
Concerto for Piano and Orchestra, No 6 in B flat major
Concerto for Piano and Orchestra, No 7 in A major
Concerto for Piano and Orchestra, No 8 in C major
Selim Palmgren
Piano Concerto No. 1 in G minor, op. 13 (1903)
Piano Concerto No. 2, op.33 'The River' (1913)
Piano Concerto No. 3 in F major, op.41 'Metamorphoses' (1915)
Piano Concerto No. 4, op.85 'April' (1926)
Piano Concerto No. 5 in A major, op.99 (1941)
Andrzej Panufnik
Piano Concerto (1964, recomposed 1972)
Hubert Parry
Piano Concerto in F-sharp
Krzysztof Penderecki
Piano Concerto (2002)
Vincent Persichetti
Concertino, op. 16 (1941)
Piano Concerto, op. 90 (1962)
Hans Pfitzner
Piano Concerto in E flat, Op. 31 (1922)
Gabriel Pierné
Piano Concerto in C minor, op. 12 (1886)
Walter Piston
Concertino (1937)
Concerto for Two Pianos and Orchestra (1964)
Ildebrando Pizzetti
Canti Della Stagione Alta (Concerto) (1930)
Manuel Ponce
Piano Concerto (1912)
Francis Poulenc
Concerto for Two Pianos (1932)
Piano Concerto (1949)
Concert champêtre (1927–28) for harpsichord and orchestra (also in version for piano and orchestra)
André Previn
Piano Concerto (1986)
Sergei Prokofiev
Piano Concerto No. 1 in D-flat, op. 10 (1912)
Piano Concerto No. 2 in G minor, Op. 16 (1913, rewritten 1923)
Piano Concerto No. 3 in C, Op. 26 (1917–21), his best known
Piano Concerto No. 4 in B-flat, op. 53 (1931), for the left hand (written for Paul Wittgenstein)
Piano Concerto No. 5 in G, op. 55 (1932)
Piano Concerto No. 6 (1953, incomplete), for two pianos and strings

Q

R 
Sergei Rachmaninoff
Piano Concerto No. 1 in F-sharp minor, Op. 1 (1891)
Piano Concerto No. 2 in C minor, Op. 18 (1901)
Piano Concerto No. 3 in D minor, Op. 30 (1909)
Piano Concerto No. 4 in G minor, Op. 40 (1926)
Rhapsody on a Theme of Paganini, Op. 43 (1934)
Concerto Élégiaque, Op. 9b (an orchestration of Rachmaninoff's Trio élégiaque No. 2 by Alan Kogosowski)
Suite No. 1 (Fantasy), Op. 5 (orch. R. Harkness)
Suite No. 2, Op. 17, Op. 17 (orch. L. Holby)
Joachim Raff
Piano Concerto in C minor, Op. 185 (1873)
Einojuhani Rautavaara
Piano Concerto No. 1, Op. 45 (1969)
Piano Concerto No. 2 (1989)
Piano Concerto No. 3 'Gift of Dreams' (1998), written for pianist Vladimir Ashkenazy
Maurice Ravel
Piano Concerto in G (1931)
Piano Concerto in D for the Left Hand (1931, written for Paul Wittgenstein)
Alan Rawsthorne
Piano Concerto No. 1 (1943)
Piano Concerto No. 2 (1951)
Concerto for Two Pianos and Orchestra (1968)
Max Reger
Piano Concerto in F minor, Op. 114 (1910)
Carl Reinecke
Piano Concerto No. 1 in F-sharp minor, Op. 72 (1860)
Piano Concerto No. 2 in E minor, Op. 120 (1872)
Piano Concerto No. 3 in C, Op. 144 (1877)
Piano Concerto No. 4 in B minor, Op. 254 (1901)
Ottorino Respighi
Piano Concerto in A minor, P. 40 (1902)
Concerto in Modo Misolidio, P. 145 (1925)
Josef Rheinberger
Piano Concerto in A-flat, op. 94 (1876)
Nikolai Rimsky-Korsakov
Piano Concerto in C-sharp minor, Op. 30 (1882)
Joaquín Rodrigo
Concerto Heroic (1942)
Julius Röntgen
 Piano Concerto in G minor (1873)
 Piano Concerto in D major, Op. 18 (1879)
 Piano Concerto in D minor (1887)
 Piano Concerto in F major (1906)
 Piano Concerto in E major (1929)
 Two Piano Concertos: No. 1 in E minor and No. 2 in C major (1929/30)
Ned Rorem
Piano Concerto No. 2 (1950)
Concerto in Six Movements
Piano Concerto No. 4 for the left hand (1993)
Nino Rota
Fantasy for piano and orchestra on twelve notes from "non si pasce di cibo mortale chi si pasce di cibo celeste" from the second act of Mozart's Don Giovanni
Concerto soiree for piano and orchestra
Concerto in E minor for piano and orchestra (piccolo mondo antico)
Concerto in C major for piano and orchestra
Albert Roussel
Concerto in C, Op. 36 (1927)
Alec Rowley
Concerto for Piano, Strings and Percussion, Op. 49 (1938)
Edmund Rubbra
Sinfonia Concertante, Op. 38 (1936, revised 1943)
Piano Concerto in G, Op. 85 (1956)
Anton Rubinstein
Piano Concerto (1847), 1 movement only
Piano Concerto in C (1849), revised as Octet in D, Op. 9 (1856)
Piano Concerto No. 1 in E minor, Op. 25 (1850)
Piano Concerto No. 2 in F, Op. 35 (1851)
Piano Concerto No. 3 in G, Op. 45 (1853-4)
Piano Concerto No. 4 in D minor, Op. 70 (1864)
Piano Concerto No. 5 in E-flat, Op. 94 (1874)
Caprice russe, Op. 102

S 
P. Peter Sacco
Piano Concerto No. 1 (1964)
Camille Saint-Saëns
Piano Concerto No. 1 in D, op. 17 (1858)
Piano Concerto No. 2 in G minor, op. 22 (1868)
Piano Concerto No. 3 in E-flat, op. 29 (1869)
Piano Concerto No. 4 in C minor, op. 44 (1873)
Piano Concerto No. 5 in F, op. 103 (1895), the Egyptian
'Africa' op.89, for piano and orchestra
'Wedding cake' op.76, caprice-valse for piano and orchestra
Allegro appassionato op.70, for piano and orchestra
Rhapsodie d'Auvergne, op. 73
Antonio Salieri
Piano Concerto in C
Piano Concerto in B Flat
Siegfried Salomon
Piano Concerto in A minor Op. 54 (1947)
Emil von Sauer
Piano Concerto No. 1 in E minor
Piano Concerto No. 2 in C minor
Franz Xaver Scharwenka
Piano Concerto No. 1 in B-flat minor, op. 32 (1877)
Piano Concerto No. 2 in C minor, op. 56 (1880)
Piano Concerto No. 3 in C sharp minor, op. 80 (1898)
Piano Concerto No. 4 in F minor, op. 82
Hans Bronsart von Schellendorff
Piano Concerto in F-sharp minor Op. 10
Franz Schmidt
Concertante Variationen über ein Thema von Beethoven (1923)
Piano Concerto No. 2 in E-flat for the Left Hand (1934)
Alfred Schnittke
Piano Concerto (No.1), for piano and orchestra (1960)
Piano Concerto (No.2), for piano and chamber orchestra (1964)
Piano Concerto (No.3), for piano and strings (1979)
Piano Concerto (No.4), for one piano four hands and chamber orchestra (1988)
Arnold Schoenberg
Piano Concerto (1942)
Ervin Schulhoff
Concerto for Piano and Small Orchestra
Piano Concerto Op. 11
William Schuman
Piano Concerto (1930, rev. 1942)
Clara Schumann
Piano Concerto in A minor, op.7 (1832-3)
Robert Schumann
Piano Concerto in A minor, op. 54 (1845)
Ludvig Schytte
Piano Concerto in C sharp minor Op. 28 (c.1884)
Alexander Scriabin
Piano Concerto in F-sharp minor, op. 20 (1897)
Fantasy for Piano and Orchestra (1887–88)
Peter Sculthorpe
Piano Concerto (1983)
Joaquim Serra
Variations for Piano and Orchestra
Roger Sessions
Piano Concerto (1956)
Giovanni Sgambati
Piano Concerto in G minor, Op. 15 (1885)
Dmitri Shostakovich
Piano Concerto No. 1 in C minor, op. 35 (1933), also includes a part for solo trumpet
Piano Concerto No. 2 in F, op. 102 (1957)
Aleksandr Shymko
Piano Concerto No.1 (2001-2002)
Piano Concerto No.2 (2006-2007)
Sheila Silver
Concerto for Piano and Orchestra (1996)
Rudolph Simonsen
Piano Concerto in F minor (1915)
Christian Sinding
Piano Concerto in D-flat, op. 6 (1887–89, revised 1901)
Leo Smit
Piano Concerto 1937
Michael Staley
Aurora, for Piano and Chamber Orchestra(1976)
Scenery of Pasts, 1993 Trio - Piano, Flute, Cello
Picasso Reflections, Piano and Chamber Group(2007)
American Rhapsody (2009)
Charles Stanford
Piano Concerto No. 1 in G, op. 59
Piano Concerto No. 2 in C minor, op. 126
Piano Concerto No. 3, op. 171 (1919) 
Bernhard Stavenhagen
Piano Concerto in B minor, op. 4 (1894)
Wilhelm Stenhammar
Piano Concerto No. 1 in B-flat minor, op. 1 (1893)
Piano Concerto No. 2 in D minor, op. 23 (1905–07)
Zygmunt Stojowski
Piano Concerto No. 1 in F-sharp minor, op. 3 (1890)
Piano Concerto No. 2 in A-flat, op. 32 (1909–10)
Igor Stravinsky
Concerto for Piano and Wind Instruments (1923-4)
Capriccio for Piano and Orchestra
Movements for Piano and Orchestra
Stjepan Šulek
Piano Concerto No. 1 (1949)
Piano Concerto No. 2 (1952)
Piano Concerto No. 3 (1970)

T 
Emil Tabakov
Concerto for Piano and Orchestra
Josef Tal
Concerto No. 1 for piano & orchestra (1945)
Concerto No. 2 for piano & orchestra (1953)
Concerto No. 3 for tenor, piano and chamber orchestra (1956)
Alexander Tansman
Suite for Two Pianos and Orchestra (1928)
Svend Erik Tarp
Piano Concerto op 39 (1942–43)
Boris Tchaikovsky
Piano Concerto in C Minor, 1971
Pyotr Ilyich Tchaikovsky
Piano Concerto No. 1 in B-flat, op. 23 (1874)
Piano Concerto No. 2 in G, op. 44 (1880)
Piano Concerto No. 3 in E-flat, op. 75 (1893)
Alexander Tcherepnin
Piano Concerto No. 1, Op. 12
Piano Concerto No. 2, Op. 26
Piano Concerto No. 3, Op. 48
Piano Concerto No. 4 ('Fantasie')
Piano Concerto No. 5, Op. 96
Piano Concerto No. 6, Op. 99
Sigismund Thalberg
Piano Concerto in F minor, Op.5
Ferdinand Thieriot (1838–1919)
Piano Concerto No. 1, in B-flat (1885)
Piano Concerto No. 2, C-minor (1904)
Ludwig Thuille
Piano Concerto in D-major (1882)
Michael Tippett
Piano Concerto (1955)
Václav Tomášek
Piano Concerto in C major
Piano Concerto in E flat major
Donald Francis Tovey
Piano Concerto in A, op. 15 (1903)
Geirr Tveitt
Piano Concerto No. 1 in F, op. 1 (1927)
Piano Concerto No. 2
Piano Concerto No. 3
Piano Concerto No. 4 'Aurora Borealis', op. 130 (1947)
Piano Concerto No. 5, op. 156 (1954)

U 
Viktor Ullmann
Klavierkonzert, Op.25 (1939)
Galina Ustvolskaya
Concerto for Piano, String Orchestra and Timpani

V 
Ralph Vaughan Williams
Piano Concerto (1933 - also exists in a version for two pianos and orchestra of 1946)
José Vianna da Motta
Piano Concerto in A (1886-7)
Heitor Villa-Lobos
Piano Concerto No. 1 (1945)
Piano Concerto No. 2 (1948)
Piano Concerto No. 3 (1952–57)
Piano Concerto No. 4 (1952)
Piano Concerto No. 5 (1954)
Suite for piano and orchestra
'Momoprecoce', fantasy for piano and orchestra
Choro No.11
Bachiana Brasileira No.3
Carl Vine
Piano Concerto (1997)

W 
William Walton
Sinfonia Concertante (1928, revised 1944)
Carl Maria von Weber
Piano Concerto No. 1 in C, J. 98 (1810)
Piano Concerto No. 2 in E-flat, J. 155 (1815)
Konzertstück for Piano and Orchestra in F minor, Op. 79, J.282
Jacob Weinberg
Piano Concerto No. 2 in C major (1944)
Judith Weir
Piano Concerto
Charles-Marie Widor
Piano Concerto No. 1 in F minor, Op. 39 (1880)
Piano Concerto No. 2 in C, Op. 77 (1905)
Jozef Wieniawski
Piano Concerto in G minor, Op. 20 (1859)
Thomas Wilson
Piano Concerto
Haydn Wood
Piano Concerto in D minor (1909)

X 

 Iannis Xenakis
 Erikhthon
 Keqrops
 Synaphaï

Y 
Richard Yardumian
Passacaglia, Recitative and Fugue, a concerto for piano and orchestra (premiered 1958, Rudolf Firkušný, Philadelphia Orchestra, conducted by Eugene Ormandy.)
Yin Chengzong et al.
Yellow River Piano Concerto (arrangement of themes from Xian Xinghai's Yellow River Cantata)

Z 
Efrem Zimbalist
Piano Concerto in E flat (composed 1953 for William Kapell, destroyed in the air crash in which the pianist died, reconstructed by the composer)

Concertos for piano and other solo instrument(s) 
 Johann Sebastian Bach
 BWV 1050 - Brandenburg concerto no.5 in D major, for harpsichord, flute, violin and strings (1721)
 BWV 1044 for harpsichord, violin, flute and strings in A minor, 1st and 3rd movements after his Prelude and Fugue in A minor for harpsichord, BWV 894 and second movement after the second movement from his trio sonata in D minor for organ, BWV 527 (1740)
Ludwig van Beethoven
Triple concerto, op. 56 (1804-5)
Elliott Carter
Double Concerto for Harpsichord and Piano with Two Chamber Orchestras (1961)
Joseph Haydn
Concerto in F, Hob. XVIII/6, for piano, violin and strings (before 1766)
Johann Nepomuk Hummel
Double Concerto in G, Op. 17 for piano and violin
Vincent d'Indy
Triple Concerto for Piano, Flute, Cello and String Orchestra, op. 89 (1927)
Frank Martin
Petite Symphonie Concertante for piano, harp, harpsichord and two string orchestras (1945)
Bohuslav Martinů
Concertino (1933) for piano, violin, cello and string orchestra
Felix Mendelssohn
Concerto for Violin and Piano in D minor (1823)
Olivier Messiaen
Concert à Quatre (1990–91, completed Loriod and Benjamin)

Other concertante works for piano and orchestra 

 Richard Addinsell
 Warsaw Concerto, from the movie Dangerous Moonlight
 Isaac Albéniz
 Rapsodia española, op. 70 (1887)
 Anton Arensky
 Fantasia on Russian Folksongs, Op. 48
 Kees van Baaren
 Concertino for Piano and Orchestra (1934)
 Mily Balakirev
 Grande fantaisie on Russian folksongs, Op. 4 (1852)
 Ludwig van Beethoven
 Fantasy in C minor for Piano, Chorus, and Orchestra, Op. 80 (Choral Fantasy) (1808)
 Adolphe Biarant
 Rapsodie Wallone (1910)
 Ernest Bloch
 Scherzo fantastique (1948)
 Felix Blumenfeld
 Allegro de concert in A major, Op. 7 (1889)
 Henriëtte Bosmans
 Concertino for Piano and Orchestra (1928)
 Benjamin Britten
 Diversions on a Theme for Left Hand and Orchestra, Op. 21 (1940), for Paul Wittgenstein
 Scottish Ballad, op. 26, for two pianos and orchestra (1941)
 Ignaz Brüll
 Rhapsodie in D minor, op. 65 (1892)
 Andante and Allegro, op. 88
 Ferruccio Busoni
 Introduction et scherzo (1882-4)
 Konzert-Fantasie, Op. 29 (1888-9)
 Konzertstück in D, Op. 31a (1890)
 Indian Fantasy, Op. 44 (1913)
 Romanza e scherzoso, Op. 54 (1921), published together with Op. 31a as Concertino
 Alfredo Casella
 Scarlattiana, divertimento su musiche di Domenico Scarlatti per pianoforte e piccola orchestra, Op.44 (1926)
 Joseph Canteloube
 Pièces françaises (1934-5)
 Cécile Chaminade
 Konzertstück in C-sharp minor, Op. 40 (1896?, fp 1908)
 Frédéric Chopin
 Variations on "Là ci darem la mano" (from Mozart's Don Giovanni), Op. 2  (1827)
 Fantasy on Polish Airs, Op. 13 (1828)
 Rondo à la Krakowiak, Op. 14 (1828)
 Andante spianato et grande polonaise brillante, Op. 22 (1830-1)
 Claude Debussy
 Printemps, L. 61 (1887), symphonic suite for choir, piano, and orchestra
 Fantaisie, L. 73 (1889–90)
 Ernő Dohnányi
 Variations on a Nursery Song, Op. 25 (1913)
 Marcel Dupré
 Fantasie, Op. 8 (1919?)
 Manuel de Falla
 Noches en los jardines de España (Nights in the Gardens of Spain, 1916)
 Gabriel Fauré
 Ballade in F-sharp, op. 19 (1881)
 Fantaisie in G, op. 111 (1919)
 John Field
 Fantaisie sur un air favorite de mon ami N.P. in A minor, H. 4A (1822), orchestral part now lost
 Serenade in B flat, H. 37
 Grande pastorale in E, H. 54A (1832), orchestral part now lost
 Gerald Finzi
 Eclogue, op. 10
 Grand Fantasia and Toccata, op. 38
César Franck
Variations brillantes sur la ronde favorite de Gustave III (1834-5)
Les Djinns, FWV 45 (1884), symphonic poem
Symphonic Variations, FWV 46 (1885)
George Gershwin
Rhapsody in Blue (1924)
Second Rhapsody (1934)
Variations on "I Got Rhythm" (1934)
Benjamin Godard
Introduction and Allegro, op. 49 (1880)
Alexander Goedicke
Konzertstück in D, op. 11 (1900)
Louis Moreau Gottschalk
Grand Tarantelle, op. 67 (1868)
Charles Gounod
Fantaisie sur l'hymne national russe (1886)
Suite Concertante in A (1890)
Enrique Granados
Suite de navidad (1914-5), arranged from opera La cieguecita de Betania
Adolf von Henselt
Variations de Concert on Quand je quittai la Normandie from Meyerbeer's Robert le Diable, op.11
Paul Hindemith
Klaviermusik, Op. 29 (1923, for left hand only)
Kammermusik II, concerto for piano and twelve solo instruments, op. 36/1 (1924)
Concert Music for Piano, Brass and Two Harps, op. 49 (1930)
The Four Temperaments (1940)
Johann Nepomuk Hummel
Rondeau Brillant in A, op. 56
Rondo Brillant on a Russian Folk Theme, op. 98 (1822)
Variations Brillantes "Das Fest der Handwerken", op. 115 (1830)
Oberons Zauberhorn — Grosse Fantasie, op. 116 (1829)
Gesellschafts Rondo in D, op. 117
Le Retour de Londres — Grand Rondeau Brillant, op. 127 (1830)
John Ireland
Legend (1933)
Leoš Janáček
Concertino (1925)
Capriccio for piano left hand, flute and brass ensemble 'Vzdor' (1926)
Robert Kahn
Konzertstücke, op.74 (1920)
Nikolai Kapustin
Toccata for piano and orchestra, op. 8 (1964)
Intermezzo for piano and orchestra, op. 13 (1968)
Nocturne in G major for piano and orchestra, op. 16 (1972)
Etude for piano and orchestra, op. 19 (1974)
Nocturne for piano and orchestra, op. 20 (1974)
Concert Rhapsody for piano and orchestra, op. 25 (1976)
Scherzo for piano and orchestra, op. 29 (1978)
Nigel Keay
Diffractions for Piano and Orchestra (1987)
Aram Khachaturian
Concert-Rhapsody in D-flat, op. 102 (1967)
Ton de Leeuw
 Danses sacrées (1990)
Franz Liszt
Grande Fantaisie Symphonique "Lelio", S. 120
Malédiction, S. 121
De Profundis - Psaume instrumental, S. 121a
Fantasy on a Theme from Beethoven's The Ruins of Athens, S. 122 (1848–52)
Fantasy on Hungarian Folk Songs, S. 123 (1852)
Totentanz, S. 126 (1838–49, revised 1853 and 1859)
Grand solo de concert, S. 365 (prepared by Leslie Howard)
Concerto pathétique in E minor, S. 365a
Hexaméron, S. 365b (orch. competed by Leslie Howard)
Transcription of Schubert's Wanderer Fantasy, S. 366 (1850–51)
Transcription of Weber's Polonaise brillante, S. 367 (1850–51)
Rapsodie espagnole, S. 254 (orch. Busoni)
Witold Lutosławski
Variations on a Theme by Paganini (1978, orig. written 1941 for two pianos)
Sergei Lyapunov
Rhapsody on Ukrainian Themes, op. 28
Frederik Magle
Symphonic "Lego" Fantasia for piano and orchestra (1995–96)
Bohuslav Martinů
Toccata e due Canzoni (1946)
Joseph MarxCastelli Romani (1930)
Felix Mendelssohn
Capriccio Brillant in B minor, op. 22 (1832)
Rondo Brillant in E-flat major, op. 29 (1834)
Serenade and Allegro giocoso in B minor, op. 43 (1838)
Darius Milhaud
Ballade, op. 61 (1920)
5 Études, op. 63 (1920)
Le Carnaval d'Aix, op. 83b (1926)
Fantaisie pastorale, op. 188 (1938)
Suite, op. 300, for 2 (or 3) Pianos & Orchestra (1950)
Suite concertante, op. 278b (1952)
Ignaz Moscheles
Recollections of Ireland, op. 69
Anticipations of Scotland: A Grand Fantasia, Op. 70
Wolfgang Amadeus Mozart
Concert Rondo No. 1 in D, K. 382 (1782)
Concert Rondo No. 2 in A, K. 386 (1782)
Eduard Nápravník
Fantaisie russe in B minor Op 39 (1881)
Ignacy PaderewskiFantaisie Polonaise, Op. 19 (1893)
Gabriel Pierné
Fantaisie-Ballet in B-flat, op.6 (1885)
Scherzo-Caprice in D, op. 25 (1890)
Poème Symphonique in D minor, op. 37 (1903)
Sergei Rachmaninoff
Rhapsody on a Theme of Paganini in A minor, Op. 43 (1934)
Joachim RaffOde to Spring, op. 76 (1857)
Suite in E-flat, op. 200
Carl Reinecke
Konzertstück in G minor, op. 33 (1848)
Ottorino Respighi
Fantasia slava in G, P. 50 (1903)
Toccata, P. 156 (1928)
Anton Rubinstein
Piano Fantasia in C, op. 84 (1869)
Konzertstück in A-flat, op. 113
Russian Capriccio, op. 120 (1878)
Frederic RzewskiA Long Time Man (24 variations on the prison song "It Makes a Long Time Man Feel Bad") (1979)
Camille Saint-Saëns
Allegro appassionato, op. 70 (1884)
Rapsodie d'Auvergne, op. 73 (1884)
"Wedding Cake" - Caprice-Valse, Op. 76 (1885)Le carnaval des animaux (2 pianos; 1886)
"Africa" Fantaisie, op. 89 (1891)
Ernest Schelling
Suite Fantastique, op. 7
Impressions from an Artist's Life (1913)
Robert Schumann
Introduction and Allegro Appassionato, op. 92
Introduction and Allegro, op. 134
Alexander Scriabin
Fantaziya in A minor (1889)
Charles StanfordConcert Variations on "Down among the Deadmen", op. 71 (1898)
Zygmunt Stojowski
Rhapsodie symphonique, op. 23 (1904)
Richard Strauss
Burleske in D minor (1885–86)Parergon zur Sinfonia Domestica, op. 73 (piano left-hand; 1924–25)Panathenänzug, op. 74 (1926–27)
Igor Stravinsky
Capriccio for Piano and Orchestra (1928-9)
Five Movements for Piano and Orchestra (1958-9)
Pyotr Ilyich Tchaikovsky
Concert Fantasy, op. 56 (1891)
Andante and Finale in B-flat, op. 79 (1893)
Michael TippettFantasy on a Theme by Handel (1942)
Geirr Tveitt
Variations on a Folksong from Hardanger for two pianos and orchestra (1949)
Ralph Vaughan WilliamsFantasia (Quasi Variazione) on the "Old 104th" Psalm Tune (1949)
Louis ViernePoème, op. 50 (1926?)
José Vianna da Motta
Fantasia Dramática
Heitor Villa-LobosChôros No. 8 (1925)Chôros No. 9 (1928)Mômo Precoce (1929)Bachianas Brasileiras No. 3 (1938)
Carl Maria von Weber
Konzertstück in F minor, op. 79 (1821)
Charles Marie WidorFantaisie in A-flat, op. 62 (1892)

 Works for orchestra or large ensemble with prominent solo piano part 

Leonard Bernstein
Symphony No. 2 The Age of Anxiety (1948, rev. 1965), after W. H. Auden
Morton FeldmanPiano and Orchestra (1975)
Hans Werner HenzeTristan, preludes for piano, electronic tapes and orchestra (1973)Requiem for piano and chamber orchestra (1990)
Vincent d'Indy
Symphonie sur un chant montagnard français, op. 25 (1886)Jour d'Été à la Montagne, Rhapsody for piano and orchestra, op. 61 (1905)
Frederik Magle
Cantabile (symphonic suite) (2004-2009)
Bohuslav Martinů
Double Concerto for 2 String Orchestras, Piano and Timpani (1938)Sinfonietta Giocosa (1940)Sinfonietta La Jolla (1950)
Olivier MessiaenTrois petites Liturgies de la Présence Divine (1943–44)Turangalîla-Symphonie (1946–48)Réveil des Oiseaux (1953)Oiseaux exotiques (1955–56)Sept haïkaï (1962)Couleurs de la Cité Céleste (1963)La Transfiguration de Notre Seigneur Jésus (1965–69), for solo piano, solo cello, solo flute, solo clarinet, solo xylorimba, solo vibraphone, large 10-part choir and large orchestraDes Canyons aux étoiles... (1971–74)Un vitrail et des oiseaux (1986)La ville d'En-haut (1987)
Arvo PärtLamentate for piano and orchestra (2002)
Francis PoulencAubade (1929) "choreographic concerto" for piano and eighteen instruments.
Alexander ScriabinProméthée, le poème du feu, op. 60 (1909–10)
Igor StravinskyPetrushkaKarol Szymanowski
Symphony No. 4, Symphonie ConcertanteToru TakemitsuArc (1963)Asterism (1968)Quatrain for violin, clarinet, cello, piano soloists and orchestra (1975)
John TavenerPalintropos (1978)
Iannis XenakisSynaphai (Connexities) (1969)Erikhthon (1974)Keqrops (1986)

 Similar works 
 Elliott Carter - Double Concerto (1959–61, for harpsichord, piano and orchestra)
 Frank Martin - Petite symphonie concertante for harp, harpsichord, piano and double string orchestra.
 Alfred Schnittke - Concerto Grosso No. 1 (1977, for two violins, harpsichord, prepared piano and orchestra)

Concerti have been written where the piano is not the only solo instrument.  A famous example is the Triple concerto (for piano, violin, cello and orchestra) by Beethoven.

There also exist a number of compositions for piano and orchestra which treat the piano as a solo instrument while not being piano concerti.  Examples of such works include George Gershwin's Rhapsody in Blue, Rachmaninov's Rhapsody on a Theme of Paganini and Liszt's Totentanz. The last two of these works are each in variation form, based on the 24th Caprice for solo violin by Niccolò Paganini and the ancient Gregorian Dies Irae chant respectively.

There are also works written for orchestra or large ensemble requiring a solo pianist, such as Olivier Messiaen's Des canyons aux étoiles... and Turangalîla-Symphonie, and Karol Szymanowski's 4th Symphony.

Composers also occasionally bring orchestral pianists into the limelight, as for example Igor Stravinsky does in episodes of his ballet Petrushka''.

See also 
 List of compositions for piano and orchestra

References 
 

 Keyboard
 
 
Keyboard and orchestra